Olszyniec  is a village in the administrative district of Gmina Walim, within Wałbrzych County, Lower Silesian Voivodeship, in south-western Poland.

The oldest known mention of the village dates back to 1335.

During World War II, Germans established a sub-camp of the Gross-Rosen concentration camp in the village.

References

Villages in Wałbrzych County